Ralf Oehri (born 26 October 1976) is a Liechtensteiner former association footballer who played as a midfielder. Between 1990 and 2002, he won 10 caps for the Liechtenstein national football team. If his date of birth is correct, he was only 13 when he won his first cap, the youngest European man to play senior international football. The rsssf site says he was three years older.

References

Association football midfielders
Liechtenstein footballers
Liechtenstein international footballers
SC Kriens players
1976 births
Living people
FC Balzers players
FC Rapperswil-Jona players
FC Chur 97 players